Festival du Bois is an annual Francophone festival held in the Maillardville neighbourhood of Coquitlam, British Columbia, Canada. This year, Festival du Bois will be held from March 24 to 26. Produced by Societe francophone de Maillardville, the festival celebrates French Canadian history, art and culture.

Festival 
The festival site in Mackin Park includes a main stage tent where mostly Canadian folk, Celtic, and world music artists perform. There is also a children's stage, a workshop tent, art and history displays, tours of the Mackin House Museum, and traditional food including tourtière, poutine, smoked meat sandwiches, maple taffy, and maple sugar pies. 

The "Festival du Bois headgear" is a green tuque embossed with a frog.

Over 17,000 people attended Festival du Bois in 2008 and were recognized as one of the "biggest festivals and cultural events in Metro Vancouver" by Business in Vancouver magazine.

References

External links
 Official Site
 Societe francophone de Maillardville

Culture of Coquitlam
Music festivals in British Columbia
Festivals established in 1990
1990 establishments in British Columbia